Religion in Great Britain may refer to:
Religion in the United Kingdom
Religion in England
Religion in Scotland
Religion in Wales